This is a list of mayors of the Council of the Municipality of Strathfield, a local government area in the Inner West region of Sydney, New South Wales, Australia. First incorporated on 2 June 1885 as the "Municipal District of Strathfield" the first council was convened and elected on 19 August 1885, which later changed to the "Municipality of Strathfield" following the passing of the 1906 Local Government Act. The council became known as "Strathfield Council" on 1 July 1993 following the enactment of a new Local Government Act, which also stipulated a change of title from "Alderman" to "Councillor". Since 1971, the Mayor is elected bi-annually by the Councillors each September. The current mayor is Cr Karen Pensabene(Australian Labor Party), elected on the 2 March 2023.

Mayors
{| class="wikitable"
|- bgcolor="#FFCC33"
! # !! Years !! Mayor !! Notes
|-
| 1 || 30 August 1885 – 4 February 1886 || George Hardie ||
|-
| 2 || 4 February 1886 – 8 February 1889 || Wilhelm von der Heyde ||
|-
| 3 || 8 February 1889 – February 1890 || Albert Allen ||
|-
| 4 || February 1890 – February 1891 || John Hinchcliffe ||
|-
| – || February 1891 – February 1892 || Albert Allen ||
|-
| – || February 1892 – February 1893 || John Hinchcliffe ||
|-
| – || February 1893 – February 1895 || Albert Allen ||
|-
| 5 || February 1895 – February 1898 || Frederick Parsons ||
|-
| 6 || February 1898 – February 1902 || Thomas Mackenzie ||
|-
| 7 || February 1902 – February 1904 || Thomas J. Dickson ||
|-
| – || February 1904 – February 1906 || Frederick Parsons ||
|-
| 8 || February 1906 – February 1908 || John Price ||
|-
| – || February 1908 – February 1911 || Thomas Mackenzie ||
|-
| 9 || February 1911 – February 1913 || Charles C. Capper ||
|-
| 10 || February 1913 – February 1916 || Benjamin R. Gelling ||
|-
| 11 || February 1916 – February 1917 || John Robert Firth ||
|-
| 12 || February 1917 – February 1919 || Ernest Laurence ||
|-
| 13 || February 1919 – December 1920 || Arthur Kessell ||
|-
| 14 || December 1920 – December 1922 || William Pilgrim ||
|-
| 15 || December 1922 – December 1924 || Frederick Wallis ||
|-
| 16 || December 1924 – December 1925 || John Curnow ||
|-
| 17 || December 1925 – December 1927 || George Arthur Davey ||
|-
| – || December 1927 – December 1932 || John Robert Firth ||
|-
| 18 || December 1932 – December 1938 || Percy Douglas Shortland ||
|-
| 19 || December 1938 – 1 June 1940 || Alexander Melville ||
|-
| 20 || June 1940 – December 1943 || William Winter Cosgrove ||
|-
| 21 || December 1943 – December 1949 || Colin Hudson ||
|- 
| 22 || December 1949 – December 1951 || Charles Morgan ||
|-
| 23 || December 1951 – December 1954 || Arthur Cave ||
|-
| 24 || December 1954 – 1957 || William Dunlop ||
|-
| 25 || 1957 – December 1959 || Stanley Nelson Hedges ||
|-
| 26 || December 1959 – December 1962 || Bruce W. Ward ||
|-
| 27 || December 1962 – December 1964 || Beresford Calverley ||
|-
| 28 || December 1964 – December 1966 || Harvey Ford ||
|-
| 29 || December 1966 – December 1967 || Frederick Cartwright ||
|-
| 30 || December 1967 – December 1968 || James E. Smith ||
|-
| 31 || December 1968 – December 1970 || William H. Boyce ||
|-
| 32 || December 1970 – September 1972 || Frank Zions ||
|-
| – || September 1972 – September 1976 || William H. Boyce ||
|-
| 33 || September 1976 – September 1983 || Clarrie G. Edwards ||
|-
| 34 || September 1983 – September 1984 || Robert B. Kell ||
|-
| 35 || September 1984 – September 1985 || Rodney J. Rimes ||
|-
| – || September 1985 – September 1988 || Robert B. Kell ||
|-
| 36 || September 1988 – September 1990 || John C. Elvy ||
|-
| – || September 1990 – September 1991 || Robert B. Kell ||
|-
| 37 || September 1991 – September 1992 || Eve Dutton ||
|-
| 38 || September 1992 – September 1994 || Leo T. O’Donnell ||
|-
| – || September 1994 – September 1995 || John C. Elvy ||
|-
| – || September 1995 – September 1996 || Eve Dutton ||
|-
| 39 || September 1996 – September 1997 || Peter Smith ||
|-
| 40 || September 1997 – September 1998 || Elizabeth Gewandt ||
|-
| 41 || September 1998 – September 2000 || Laurel O’Toole ||
|-
| 42 || September 2000 – September 2003 || Virginia Judge (Labor) ||
|-
| 43 || September 2003 – September 2004 || John Abi-Saab ||
|-
| 44 || September 2004 – September 2005 || Alfred Tsang ||
|-
| 45 || September 2005 – September 2007 || Bill Carney ||
|-
| 46 || September 2007 – 26 February 2008 || Scott Farlow (Liberal) ||
|-
| 47 || 26 February 2008 – September 2008 || Paul Barron (Labor) ||
|-
| 48 || September 2008 – September 2009 || Keith Kwon (Labor) ||
|-
| 49 || September 2009 – September 2011 || Tony Maroun (Liberal) ||
|-
| – || September 2011 – September 2012 || Paul Barron (Independent) ||
|-
| 50 || 17 September 2012 – 3 September 2013 || Guilian Vaccari (Liberal) ||
|-
| 51 || 3 September 2013 – 30 September 2014 || Daniel Bott (Labor) ||
|-
| – || 30 September 2014 – 29 September 2015 || Guilian Vaccari (Liberal) ||
|-
| 52 || 29 September 2015 – 27 September 2016 || Sang Ok (Liberal) ||
|-
| 53 || 27 September 2016 – September 2017 || Andrew Soulos (Independent) ||
|-
| – ||26 September 2017 – 3 September 2019
| Guilian Vaccari (Liberal) ||
|-
|54
|3 September 2019 – 14 September 2021
|Antoine Doueihi (Liberal) ||
|-
|55
|14 September 2021 – 03 December 2021
|Stephanie Kokkolis (Liberal)
|
|-
|56
|12 January 2022 - 2nd March 2023
|Matthew Blackmore (Strathfield Independent)
|

References

Strathfield
Mayors of Strathfield
Mayors Strathfield